Gauthier Point is a point which forms the northern extremity of Doumer Island in the Palmer Archipelago. It was discovered by the French Antarctic Expedition, 1903–05, under Jean-Baptiste Charcot, who named it for François Gauthier, builder of the expedition ships Français and Pourquoi-Pas.

References

Headlands of the Palmer Archipelago
Doumer Island